Toda (written: 戸田) is a Japanese surname. Notable people with the surname include:

Erika Toda (born 1988), Japanese actress
Hiroshi Toda (born 1928), Japanese mathematician
Jōsei Toda (1900–1958), educator and peace activist
Toda Katsushige (1557–1600), Japanese daimyō
Toda Kazuaki (1542–1604), Japanese samurai
Kazuyuki Toda (born 1977), Japanese football player
Keiko Toda (born 1957), Japanese actress
Morikazu Toda (1917–2010), Japanese physicist
Naho Toda (born 1974), Japanese actress
Natsuko Toda (born 1936), subtitles translator
, Japanese speed skater
Toda Seigen (fl. 1519–1590), Japanese swordsman
Seinosuke Toda (born 1959), computer scientist
Tomojiro Toda (1946–2016), sumo wrestler

See also

Tola (name)
Tona (name)
Tonda (name)
Tova

Japanese-language surnames